Hildegarde of Burgundy (–1104) was a French noble, Duchess consort of Gascony and Aquitaine by marriage to William VIII, Duke of Aquitaine.

She was the only daughter of Robert I, Duke of Burgundy with his second wife, Ermengarde of Anjou. She was, and by marriage, Duchess of Gascony and Aquitaine.

She married William VIII, Duke of Aquitaine; she was his third wife. William and Hildegarde had these children together:
 William IX, Duke of Aquitaine
 Agnes of Aquitaine, Queen of Aragon and Navarre
 Beatrice? married firstly to Alfonso VI of Leon and Castile and secondly to Elias I, Count of Maine.

William’s birth was a cause of great celebration at the Aquitanian court, but the Church at first considered him illegitimate because of his parents’ consanguinity. This obliged his father to make a pilgrimage to Rome soon after his birth to seek papal approval of his marriage to Hildegarde.

References

1050s births
1104 deaths
French duchesses
11th-century French people
11th-century French women
12th-century French people
12th-century French women